Chatilla van Grinsven (born 23 February 1991) is a Dutch basketball player who is a member of the Dutch national team. She played college basketball for Colorado State and Saint Joseph before playing professionally in Europe.

College career
In 2008 she signed her athletic-scholarship in the United States to play for Colorado State University. During her first season, she was forced by the NCAA to sit out four games for having played on a team in Netherlands which had professional players prior to her arrival to CSU. She averaged 4.1 points and 3.1 rebounds as a freshman and 12.0 points and 6.1 rebounds as a sophomore. In January 2011, she asked and received a release from her scholarship.

In 2011, van Grinsven transferred to Saint Joseph’s University to play for the Hawks in Philadelphia, where she had to sit out the 2011-2012 season due to NCAA transfer rules. Living in Philadelphia, van Grinsven became an active member of the “Heart of a Hawk” service program, where she dedicated her free time to the Children’s Hospital of Philadelphia while also serving food to the homeless people with the help of several local non-profit-organizations. In May 2012, van Grinsven was awarded the Roosevelt Hunter Community Service Award.

In 2012, van Grinsven became eligible to play for Saint Joseph's University and marked the 2012-2013 season as an distinguished year for her and the team (15ppg and 10.5rpg). Van Grinsven led her team to the Atlantic-10 championship and the NCAA tournament appearance for the first time in 10 years, while accumulating numerous honours throughout her season such as the A-10 First Team All Conference, A-10 All Championship Team, Big-5 Player of the Year, scoring her 1000th career point, while winning the NCAA Woman of the Year winner award in the A-10 Conference. Van Grinsven was also nominated as the NCAA Woman of the Year Award in the United States; awarding her distinctive performance in the class-room, on the basketball court, and her service in the community. In May 2013, van Grinsven graduated with a bachelor's degree in International Business with a focus in Economics.

Colorado State and Saint Joseph's statistics

Source

Professional career
After going undrafted in the 2013 WNBA draft, van Grinsven signed a training camp contract with the Connecticut Sun. In the winter of 2013, she signed her first European professional contract with the reigning French Ligue Féminine champions Bourges Basket where she won the Coupe de France and reached the Final Four of the FIBA EuroLeague.

In 2014, van Grinsven signed with the Turkish League club Ormanspor in Ankara and in 2015 she moved to the French Premier League club in Arras, becoming a prominent player in the French League with her rebounding skills (9.5rpg) and scoring capacity (13.5ppg). In 2016 she played for the Turkish Premier League team Osmaniye, and in 2017 returned to Turkey with Euroleague powerhouse Galatasaray in Istanbul.

In 2018, van Grinsven signed with Uni Ferrol of the Spanish Liga Femenina de Baloncesto where she was a prominent player for the team in scoring and rebounding. In season 2019-2020, she played for EuroCup team KP Brno in the Czech Republic, her 14th year as a professional athlete.

Due to the COVID-19 outbreak in Europe, she decided to sit out the 2020-21 season.

National team career
van Grinsven has been a member of the Dutch National team program since 2006, and was selected to the Dutch senior team in 2010.

Personal life
In 2021, she appeared in the television show De Verraders. She reached the final and she won part of the silver bars that were earned over the course of the show.

References

External links
Profile at Eurobasket.com
Saint Joseph's Bio
Colorado State Rams bio

1991 births
Living people
Colorado State Rams women's basketball players
Dutch expatriate basketball people in France
Dutch expatriate basketball people in Spain
Dutch expatriate basketball people in Turkey
Dutch expatriate basketball people in the United States
Dutch women's basketball players
Sportspeople from Helmond
Saint Joseph's Hawks women's basketball players
21st-century Dutch women